G.651.1 is an international standard developed by the  Standardization Sector of the International Telecommunication Union (ITU-T) that specifies multi-mode optical fiber (MMF) cable.

History 
The G.651.1 Recommendation builds on a previous fiber optic specification in G.651.

G.651.1 was first published in 2007. Revisions of the standard were since published in 2008, and 2018 (November).

References 

ITU-T recommendations
ITU-T G Series Recommendations